Contact is Minori Chihara's second solo album. It was first announced to be released at a press conference held during August 16, 2007 as part of her singing career revival and contains the title tracks from her two CD singles: Junpaku Sanctuary and Kimi ga Kureta Anohi. Its first pressing is a "Silver Limited Edition" including a foil slipcase and quad-fold digipak. A follow-up thirteenth track "Contact 13th" was released with the PV DVD Message 01 on December 26, 2007 on an extra CD included in the package. It is unknown if this track will be included in subsequent printings of the Contact album in the future.

Track listing
"Contact"

"Cynthia"
"sleeping terror"
"too late? not late..."

"mezzo forte"

"truth gift"
"Contact 13th" (follow-up track released on Message 01)

References

2007 albums
Lantis (company) albums
Minori Chihara albums